Music Bank (RR: Myujikbaengkeu) is a South Korean music program which airs every Friday at 17:00 KST on KBS2. As of 2015, the show is also broadcast in more than a hundred countries through KBS World. Episodes are filmed at the KBS New Wing Open Hall in Yeouido-dong, Yeongdeungpo-gu. The show also organizes the global live concert Music Bank World Tour.

History 
Prior to Music Bank, Top 10 Songs (가요톱10) debuted in 1981 airing live at 6:30 (KST) on Fridays and aired until 1998. For the first few months of 1998, Bravo New Generation  took its place, but due to low ratings, it was quickly replaced by Music Bank on June 18, 1998. The chart format that was used since Top 10 Songs was abandoned in late 2001 due to controversy and was changed into a request format.

In 2005, the show was moved to Sunday afternoons at 12:45 (KST)  and became a recorded broadcast. Due to sinking ratings, in September 2007, the show returned to its original time slot of Fridays evenings at 6:30 (KST) and returned to a live format. The charts were revived as category-based charts.

In January 2008, the category-based charts were combined into the K-Chart which is the familiar countdown chart and the only program to do so. In June 2008, the show extended to 70 minutes, airing from 6:30 (KST) to 7:40 (KST) making it the longest music program on air. In November 2008, as part of the Autumn format changes, the show began airing from 6:40 (KST) to 8:00 (KST) for 80 minutes. In May 2010, as part of the Spring format changes, the show began airing from 5:50 (KST) to 7:10 (KST) for 80 minutes.

On August 27, 2010, Music Bank began airing live to 54 countries around the world through KBS World, and included new interactive features for international viewers through Twitter.

On November 11, 2011, as part of the autumn format changes, the show began airing for 105 minutes from 6:10 (KST) to 7:55 (KST), following KBS News 6.

In August 2012, Asian American cable network Myx TV began airing the first English dubbed version of Music Bank.

Since October 25, 2013, the show began airing for 80 minutes from 6:30 (KST) to 7:50 (KST), following KBS Global 24, which was transferred from KBS1 with effect from October 21, 2013.

Since February 10, 2023, it is hosted by Lee Chae-min and Le Sserafim's Hong Eun-chae. Past hosts include Song Hye-kyo, Rain, Ji Sung, Song Joong-ki, Park Seo-joon, Yoon Bora, Irene, Park Bo-gum, Choi Bo-min, Shin Ye-eun, Choi Soo-bin, Arin, Park Sung-hoon and Ive's Jang Won-young among others.

K-Chart 
K-Chart is the countdown charts of Music Bank. The charts are calculated by combining the Digital Music Charts (60%), Album Sales (5%), Number of times broadcast on KBS (20%), K-POP Fan Voting Charts (Mubeat App) (10%), and social media charts (5%). This charts tracking from Monday to Sunday, and the Top 50 songs of the week are featured on the show, where the Top 50–21 songs are shown via marquee and the Top 20–3 songs are featured by the hosts. The hosts showcase the Top Two songs in beginning of show and announce who will be the winner of the week. The Number 1 song on the chart is the winner of that week's chart and receives an award.

During the last week of June, the most popular song of the first half of the year is awarded the Music Bank First Half 1st Place award. During the last week of December, the Music Bank 1st Place award (or Music Bank MVP in 2008) is awarded to the most popular song of the entire year.

Prior to the combined K-Charts, category-based charts were used. From September to December 2007, every week a different category (Digital Music Charts, Karaoke Charts, Viewers Choice Charts, Album Sales Charts) was featured. Technically, each category would only be featured once a month. It was similar to K-Chart except the results each week could only be based on a specific chart, and not all the charts combined. From January 2008 to April 2009, two charts were used. Every week, the Digital Music Charts and Album Sales Charts were used, and at the end of the month were the combined charts (Album Sales Charts (20%) + Digital Music Charts (50%) + Viewers Choice Charts (30%)). In May 2009, this was abandoned for the combined charts featured every week. Note that the Music Bank ranking system is different from other previous and current televised K-Pop music shows, in that an artist can win an unlimited number of times for the same song (other shows generally remove it from the charts after three wins, for Music Core it's after five wins or two months since release). While other music chart shows have a full score of 10,000 or 11,000, Music Bank's full score is 200,000, meaning Digital Music Charts category have 140,000 score as full score, 20,000 for Broadcast, 20,000 for K-POP Fan Voting Charts (Mubeat App) 10,000 for Album Sales, and finally 10,000 from Social Media. The new criteria for Music Bank took effect in the January 7, 2023 episode, where the Digital Music Chart percentage decreased from 65% to 60%, the Album Sales are will now be acquired from Gaon instead of the previous Hanteo chart, the KBS Broadcast Plays now added its digital channel in the aggregation scoring alongside its TV and radio channels, and the Social Media Charts will be sourced from the YouTube and TikTok data gathered from the Gaon charts.

Winners

Hosts

Achievements by artists 

Most No. 1 winners

Longest consecutive No. 1 songs

Songs with most awards:

Top 10 highest scores (3rd system) February 25, 2022 – December 30, 2022

Scoring system: digital music charts (60%), number of times broadcast on KBS (20%),  viewers choice charts (10%), album sales (5%) and social media charts (5%)

Top 10 highest scores (current system) January 6, 2023 – present

Scoring system: digital music charts (60%), number of times broadcast on KBS (20%),  K-pop fan vote (10%), album sales (5%) and social media charts (5%)

Top 10 highest scores (all time) March 2013 – present

Tours
Music Bank World Tour

Similar programs
SBS Inkigayo
MBC Show! Music Core
Mnet M Countdown
Arirang TV Pops in Seoul
Arirang TV Simply K-Pop (formerly called The M-Wave and Wave K)
JTBC Music on Top
JTBC Music Universe K-909
MBC M Show Champion
SBS M The Show

See also
 KBS Song Festival
 Music programs of South Korea

References
General

Specific

External links
  
 Music Bank at KBS World

Korean Broadcasting System original programming
1990s South Korean television series
2000s South Korean television series
2010s South Korean television series
2020s South Korean television series
South Korean music chart television shows
Korean-language television shows
1998 South Korean television series debuts